Baron Kenilworth, of Kenilworth in the County of Warwick, is a title in the Peerage of the United Kingdom. It was created in 1937 for the motor industry magnate Sir John Siddeley. His grandson, the third Baron, was an interior designer and the founder of John Siddeley International Ltd.  the title is held by the latter's son, the fourth Baron, who succeeded in 1981.

The first Baron purchased Kenilworth Castle in 1937. The house is now in the care of English Heritage.

Barons Kenilworth (1937)
John Davenport Siddeley, 1st Baron Kenilworth (1866–1953)
Cyril Davenport Siddeley, 2nd Baron Kenilworth (1894–1971)
John Tennant Davenport Siddeley, 3rd Baron Kenilworth (1924–1981)
John Randle Siddeley, 4th Baron Kenilworth (b. 1954)

The heir apparent is the present holder's son Hon. William Randle Siddeley (b. 1992).

Arms

Notes

References
Kidd, Charles, Williamson, David (editors). Debrett's Peerage and Baronetage (1990 edition). New York: St Martin's Press, 1990, 

Baronies in the Peerage of the United Kingdom
Noble titles created in 1937